J. D. McCarty (August 28, 1916 – December 30, 1980) was Speaker of the Oklahoma House of Representatives, serving three consecutive terms. The Democratic party, to which he belonged, had already named him as its nominee for a fourth term when he lost his reelection bid to Representative Vondel Smith in the 1966 election.

In 1967, he was indicted and convicted for Federal income tax evasion. Reportedly he had failed to report the receipt of $12,000 in bribes. He was sentenced to three years' imprisonment, which he served in the Texarkana Federal Correctional Institution, where he completed his sentence in June 1969.

Biography
McCarty attended Oklahoma University, where he majored in economics and government. He also worked for the Daily Oklahoman at night, while attending classes during the day. In World War II, he served in the U.S. Navy in the South Pacific.

He was first elected to the House in 1940. By the time he rose to the speakership in 1960, the Tulsa World called him, "...the most powerful person in the legislature." The World also said that some political observers in the state said that he was the most powerful speaker in the state's history.

Family
The parents of J. D. McCarty were Edward B.(1889–1971) and Cora L. McCarty (1899–1984). He married Bessie M. McCarty (1938–1976), and they had two children.

Notes

References 

1916 births
1980 deaths
University of Oklahoma alumni
Politicians from Oklahoma City
Oklahoma politicians convicted of crimes
United States Navy personnel of World War II
Speakers of the Oklahoma House of Representatives
Democratic Party members of the Oklahoma House of Representatives
20th-century American politicians
Prisoners and detainees of the United States federal government
American people convicted of tax crimes